The following is a list of awards and nominations received by American actor Gene Hackman. For his role in The French Connection, he won an Academy Award, a BAFTA Award, and a Golden Globe for Best Actor. He won all three awards again for his role in Unforgiven. In 2003, he won the Cecil B. DeMille Award.

Academy Awards

BAFTA Awards

Golden Globe Awards

European awards

National Board of Review Awards

Satellite Awards

Screen Actors Guild Awards

Film critic awards

Military awards
Gene Hackman's military decorations and medals include:

References

Hackman, Gene